Heteroecus is a genus of gall wasps in the family Cynipidae. There are about seven described species in Heteroecus.

Species
These seven species belong to the genus Heteroecus:
 Heteroecus crescentus (Lyon)
 Heteroecus dasydactyli (Ashmead, 1896) (woolly gall wasp)
 Heteroecus devorus (Lyon)
 Heteroecus lyoni (Lyon's gall wasp)
 Heteroecus melanoderma Kinsey, 1922 (golden gall wasp)
 Heteroecus pacificus (Ashmead, 1896) (beaked spindle gall wasp)
 Heteroecus sanctaeclarae (mushroom gall wasp)

References

Further reading

 
 
 

Cynipidae
Articles created by Qbugbot

Hymenoptera genera
Taxa described in 1922